Rupert Ursin (born January 26, 1973) is an Austrian experimental physicist active in the field of quantum entanglement and communications. He is currently deputy director at the Institute for Quantum Optics and Quantum Information (IQOQI) of the Austrian Academy of Sciences.

Education 
Ursin completed his Masters diploma in 2001, then in December 2006 completed a PhD dissertation at University of Vienna on quantum teleportation over long distances. He continued with postdoctoral studies in 2007, and since 2013 has served as a research group leader at the IQOQI.

Research 
Ursin's research group is active in the field of quantum entanglement and communications. In particular, the team demonstrated an example of loophole-free Bell inequality and worked on quantum key distribution.  

In 2004, Ursin and colleagues from the Institute for Experimental Physics at the University of Vienna succeeded in the world's-first demonstration of quantum teleportation of a photon outside of the laboratory, sending it a distance of 600 meters across the River Danube.

In 2007, Ursin's group succeeded in distributing entangled photons between the Canary Islands La Palma and Tenerife over a world-record distance of 144 km.  

In 2016, Ursin's group successfully tested entanglement in accelerated reference frames.

Awards 
 2009 Christian-Doppler-Prize

Bibliography 
 Fink, M. et al. Experimental test of photonic entanglement in accelerated reference frames. Nat. Comm. 8, 15304 doi: 10.1038/ncomms15304 (2017).
 Rupert Ursin et al.: Quantum Teleportation across the Danube, Nature, 430, 849 (2004).
 Rupert Ursin et al.: Entanglement-based quantum communication over 144 km, Nature Physics 3, 481 - 486 (2007)

External links 
 Ursin group homepage Institute for Quantum Optics and Quantum Information Vienna

References 

University of Vienna alumni
1973 births
Scientists from Salzburg
21st-century Austrian physicists
Living people